Ahmad Akash Walbi  (Arabic: أحمد عكاش والبي) is a football player who plays as a left back. He has been capped twice for the Saudi Arabia national team.

He joined Al-Nasr in the winter of 2015, having left the Ettifaq FC club of Dammam.

References

Living people
Saudi Arabian footballers
1990 births
Al Nassr FC players
Ettifaq FC players
Al-Kawkab FC players
Saudi First Division League players
Saudi Professional League players
Association football fullbacks